Otgon (The young) is a sum of Zavkhan Province in western Mongolia. In 2005, its population was 3,478.

References 

Districts of Zavkhan Province